Hedemora Municipality (Hedemora kommun) is a municipality in Dalarna County in central Sweden. Its seat is in the city of Hedemora.

In 1966 the City of Hedemora was amalgamated with the rural municipality by the same name and with Husby.

Military history
Hedemora town was a recruit training place under Gustav Vasa's campaign against Denmark. In the victorious Battle of Brunnbäck Ferry (Swedish: Slaget vid Brunnbäcks färja) in  1521, Peder Svensson from the village Vibberboda in Hedemora Municipality was one of the two commanding officers; (the other was Olof Bonde from Norrbärke in Smedjebacken Municipality).

The Livkompaniet (company designated to protect the regiment chief) of Dalarna Regiment (Dalregementet)  was located in Hedemora and Husby parishes between 1682 and 1901. The head officers of Dalregementet also lived in Husby during this period at Näs kungsgård and Husby kungsgård.

Localities 
 Hedemora (seat)
 Långshyttan
 Vikmanshyttan
 Garpenberg
 Västerby
 Husby

Riksdag elections

Sister cities 
Hedemora has five sister cities:

 Bauska, Latvia
 Ishozi-Ishunju-Gera, Tanzania
 Nord Fron, Norway
 Nysted, Denmark
 Vehkalahti, Finland

References

External links 

Hedemora - Official website 

 
Municipalities of Dalarna County